Roger Eugene Murdock (July 27, 1909 – July 2, 1995) served as interim LAPD police chief in 1969 after Thomas Reddin had left to pursue a job in the media industry.  He graduated from Los Angeles High School and USC, where he earned a degree with honors in public administration. He also studied criminal law and the rules of evidence at Los Angeles College of Law and taught a course at USC called "Investigation of Major Crimes."   Murdock joined the LAPD in 1932.  He headed the LAPD during the Charles Manson murders.

Roger Murdock was a member of Liberal Arts Masonic Lodge, #677 of Los Angeles, CA.

References
LA Times obituary

1909 births
1995 deaths
Chiefs of the Los Angeles Police Department